Kateshal-e Bala (also Romanized as Kateshāl-e Bālā; also known as Kateh Shāl, Kateshāl, and Katshāl) is a village in Layl Rural District, in the Central District of Lahijan County, Gilan Province, Iran. At the 2006 census, its population was 366, in 104 families.

References 

Populated places in Lahijan County